B-Say-Tah is a resort village in the Canadian province of Saskatchewan within Census Division No. 6. It is on the shores of Echo Lake of the Fishing Lakes in the Rural Municipality of North Qu'Appelle No. 187.

On the west side of the community is the Saskatchewan Fish Hatchery, which is the only Aquaculture facility in Saskatchewan that produces fish for recreational purposes.

History 
B-Say-Tah incorporated as a resort village on August 6, 1915.

Demographics 

Government 
The Resort Village of B-Say-Tah is governed by an elected municipal council and an appointed administrator that meets on the third Tuesday of every month. The mayor is Isaac Sneath and its administrator is Richelle Haanstra.

See also 
List of communities in Saskatchewan
List of municipalities in Saskatchewan
List of resort villages in Saskatchewan
List of villages in Saskatchewan
List of summer villages in Alberta

References

External links 

Resort villages in Saskatchewan
North Qu'Appelle No. 187, Saskatchewan
Division No. 6, Saskatchewan